William Harper (born October 10, 1949) is a Chicago photographer and composer. His photography is concerned with natural form and line and his music is theatrical, technology-based work sourced from liturgical and folk traditions. Harper first earned critical acclaim for his work defining a Chicago style of new music theater and opera as the creator and producer of
many full-length original works for the American Ritual Theater Company (ARTCO).
Concurrent with these projects, and subsequently, Harper’s opera, music theater,
dance, orchestra, chorus, and electro-acoustic works have been commissioned and
performed by companies including The Minnesota Opera Company, The New Music
Theater Ensemble of Minneapolis, INTAR Hispanic American Cultural Center, The
Goodman Theater, Hartford Stage and The Music Theatre Group. Harper’s recently
completed Unquiet Myths, a suite of electro-acoustic pieces was commissioned by The
Ellen Sinopoli Dance Company for Spill Out!, which premiered in 2006 and is scheduled
to begin a national tour this year. William Harper received a PhD in music composition
from the Eastman School of Music, and has received support from many foundations
including the National Institute for Music Theater, the Djerassi Foundation, the Yaddo
Foundation, the National Endowment for the Arts, the Illinois and New York State Arts
Councils and The MacArthur Foundation.

Harper has three sisters including a twin sister, Jessica Harper, Lindsay Harper duPont and  Diana Harper. He also has two brothers, Sam Harper and Rev. Charles Harper.

Photography

Recent Exhibitions & Events
 2013	Water!, juried show, Center for FIne Art Photography, Fort Collins
 2012	Hot New Pix, Center Gallery at the Midwest Center for Photography, Wichita
 2012	Transformational Learning, group show, Brick Gallery, Chicago
 2012	Night Light, juried show, Darkroom Gallery, Essex Jct., Vermont
 2012	Family Dynamics, juried show, Kiernan Gallery, Lexington, Virginia
 2012	Between Dusk and Dawn, juried show, Kiernan Gallery, Lexington, Virginia
 2012	Family Dynamics, juried show, Kiernan Gallery, Lexington, Virginia
 2012	Portfolio Prize, Center for FIne Art Photography, Fort Collins
 2012	Water, Ice & Light - Solo show, University Club, Chicago
 2011	Grand prize, Filter Festival, Chicago
 2011	Beginnings, juried show, Black Cloud Gallery, Chicago
 2011	Faces of Evanston, Noyes Cultural Arts Center, Evanston, IL
 2011	Real People, juried show, The Courthouse, Woodstock, IL
 2010-12	Court, Transistor, Chicago
 2009	Finding Middle Ground, Dayton Visual Arts Center
 2009	Group Show at Walker Fine Arts, Denver, CO
 2009	Group Show at Lincoln Center, Ft. Collins, CO
 2008	Breaking Ground, Solo show,  Sinclair Community College, Dayton, OH	
 2008	Real People, juried show, The Courthouse, Woodstock, IL
 2008	The Workshop, Berkeley, CA
 2008	Minimal, Flatfile Gallery, Chicago, IL
 2008	Faculty Sabbatical Show, Betty Rymer Gallery, Art Institute of Chicago
 2006	Digitally Propelled Ideas, Kellogg University Art Gallery California State Polytechnic University Pomona CA
 2006	Snapshots, The ARC Gallery. Chicago, IL

Music: Selected Works

Operas and Music Theatre 
 2000        Heroism with Frederick Feirstein, Nassau Community College, New York
 1997 	  The Bacchae Harvard University, Katherine Walker, Music Theater Group, New York
 1995 	  Extraordinary Measures with Eve Ensler, Music Theater Group, New York
 1993 	El Greco INTAR Hispanic American Arts Center, New York
 1992 	Martin Guerre (Orchestrations) with Roger Ames Hartford Stage, Hartford
 1992 	Cooking the World with Bob Berkey Music Theater Group, New York
 1989 	Snow Leopard Minnesota Opera Company, Minneapolis
 1987 	Tantracidal Mania Minnesota Opera Company, Minneapolis
 1986 	Peyote Roadkill ARTCO, Chicago
 1983 	John Ball Shot Them All N.A.M.E. Gallery, Chicago

Recordings 
 2006   Unquiet Myths, A collection of electro-acoustic pieces
 2005	   Requiem, Mass for chorus, SATB and electronic accompaniment
 2004	   Marlidendur, Music for strings, percussion, and boys choir
 2002	   The Banjo of Death Sleeping, Three electro-acoustic pieces
 2000	   El Greco, Opera

Works for Orchestra 
 1999 	Marlidendur Gudmundur Emilsson, The Baltic Philharmonic Chamber Orchestra, Reykjavik
 1997 	Scenes from the Valley of the Black Pig  Full Orchestra, ARTCO, Chicago
 1996 	Requiem Mass Chorus, Orchestra and Alto Solo, Harle & Ken Montgomery Foundation
 1994 	Seasons of the Heart Song for Soprano Solo and String Orchestra. Texts by Bernardo Solano, INTAR, New York.
 1990 	Marouska Variations Full Orchestra, ARTCO, Chicago

Dance, Film, and Incidental Music 
 2012-13   Reflections on the way o the Gallows - Eight films and a Dark Tourism project by Collette Copeland
 2006     Unquiet Myths for Spill Out!  Ellen Sinopoli Dance Company, Troy
 1992 	Words Divine INTAR Hispanic American Arts Center, New York
 1987 	Waiting in the Dark For Bay Area Playwrights, Mill Valley
 1986 	Changing Habits WTTW-TV, Chicago
 1986 	Macando Dreiske Performance Ensemble, Chicago
 1985 	Illinois Turner Broadcasting, Atlanta
 1985 	Light Kanopy Dance Theater, Madison
 1984 	Crimson Cowboy (Opera/Dance Work) ARTCO, Chicago
 1984 	Julius Caesar Alliance Theater, Atlanta
 1984 	Red River The Goodman Theater, Chicago
 1983 	Dead Birds (Opera/Dance Work) ARTCO, Chicago
 1983 	Calyx Columbia Dance Center, Chicago
 1983 	I've Known Rivers (Dance/Opera Work) MoMing, Chicago

References
 Link to Center for Fine Art Photography show Water!
 NPR report on Harper's photography show at Flatfile Gallery, Chicago
 Art Institute Faculty Bio
 NY Times review of Harper's opera, El Greco
 NY Times review of Extraordinary Measures
  NY Times review of Words Divine
 NY Times review of "I've Known Rivers"
 William Harper, Requiem Survey
 Chicago Tribune Article about Harper's opera, El Greco
 Chicago Tribune review of Harper's opera Peyote Roadkill
 List of composers who have spent time at Yaddo
  NY Times article about Marlidendur
  Recordings by the Riga Dome Boys Choir
 Playlist - Classical Discoveries 04/06/05
 Summary of News in Latvia 11/99 - See Calendar of Arts Events
  21st Century Music calendar entry for Voyages Concert 11/9/99
  Brown University Press release on Voyages Festival 11/99
 Prayer Wheels Into Turbines (William Harper's Snow Leopard) - Kyle Gann, Village Voice December 19, 1989 (Vol. XXXIV No. 51, p. 84)
 Dad Was an Old Master (William Harper's El Greco) - Kyle Gann, Village Voice October 12, 1993 (Vol. XXXVIII No. 41, p. 82)
 Link to doctoral dissertation: Olivier Messiaen's Et Exspecto Resurrectionem Mortuorum

External links
 .mp3s available from Amazon.com
 William Harper music website
 William Harper - Photography website
http://whharper.tumblr.com O Vos Omnes - Blog
 

American male composers
21st-century American composers
American photographers
Living people
Place of birth missing (living people)
1949 births
21st-century American male musicians